A mannequin (also called a dummy, lay figure, or dress form) is a doll, often articulated, used by artists, tailors, dressmakers, window dressers and others, especially to display or fit clothing and show off different fabrics and textiles. Previously, the English term referred to human models and muses (a meaning which it still retains in French and other European languages); the meaning as a dummy dating from the start of World War II. 

Life-sized mannequins with simulated airways are used in the teaching of first aid, CPR, and advanced airway management skills such as tracheal intubation. During the 1950s, mannequins were used in nuclear tests to help show the effects of nuclear weapons on humans. Also referred to as mannequins are the human figures used in computer simulation to model the behavior of the human body. 

Mannequin comes from the French word , which had acquired the meaning "an artist's jointed model", which in turn came from the Flemish word , meaning "little man, figurine", referring to late Middle Ages practice in Flanders whereby public display of even women's clothes was performed by male pages (boys). Fashion shops in Paris ordered dolls in reed from Flemish merchants. Flanders was in logistics the easiest region to import dolls in reed from, as transport on the rivers Schelde and Oise provide easy routes from Flanders to Paris. As the Flemish wrote '' for 'little man' on their invoices, the Parisians pronounced this as 'mannequen', hence shifted to 'mannequin'. A mannequin is thus masculine, not feminine.

History
Shop mannequins are derived from dress forms used by fashion houses for dress making. The use of mannequins originated in the 15th century, when miniature "milliners' mannequins" were used to demonstrate fashions for customers. Full-scale, wickerwork mannequins came into use in the mid-18th century. Wirework mannequins were manufactured in Paris from 1835.

Shop display
The first female mannequins, made of papier-mâché, were made in France in the mid-19th century. Mannequins were later made of wax to produce a more lifelike appearance. In the 1920s, wax was supplanted by a more durable composite made with plaster.

Modern day mannequins are made from a variety of materials, the primary ones being fiberglass and plastic. The fiberglass mannequins are usually more expensive than the plastic ones, tend to be not as durable, but are significantly more realistic. Plastic mannequins, on the other hand, are a relatively new innovation in the mannequin field and are built to withstand the hustle of customer foot traffic usually witnessed in the store they are placed in.

Mannequins are used primarily by retail stores as in-store displays or window decoration. However, many online sellers also use them to display their products for their product photos (as opposed to using a live model). While the classic female mannequin has a smaller to average breast size, manufacturers are now selling “sexy/busty mannequins” and “voluptuous female mannequins” with 40DDs and Barbie doll-sized waists.

Use by artists
Historically, artists have often used articulated mannequins, sometimes known as lay figures, as an aid in drawing draped figures. One advantage of this is that clothing or drapery arranged on a mannequin may be kept immobile for far longer than would be possible by using a living model. Another is that a sitter suitably modelled by one of these is saved the inconvenience of frequently visiting the artist's studio. In 18th century England, lay-figures are known to have been owned by portrait painters such as Joshua Reynolds and Thomas Gainsborough, and by Arthur Devis for the arrangement of his conversation pieces.

Medical education

Anatomical models such as ivory manikins were used by doctors in the 17th-century to study medical anatomy and as a teaching aid for pregnancy and childbirth. Each figure could be opened up to reveal internal organs and sometimes fetuses. There are only 180 known surviving ancient medical manikins worldwide.

Today, medical simulation mannequins, models or related artefacts such as SimMan, the Transparent Anatomical Manikin or Harvey are widely used in medical education. These are sometimes also referred to as virtual patients. The term manikin refers exclusively to these types of models, though mannequin is often also used.

In first aid courses, manikins may be used to demonstrate methods of giving first aid (e.g., resuscitation). Fire and coastguard services use mannequins to practice life-saving procedures. The mannequins have similar weight distribution to a human. Special obese mannequins and horse mannequins have also been made for similar purposes.

Over-reliance on mass-produced mannequins has been criticized for teaching medical students a hypothetical "average" that does not help them identify or understand the significant amount of normal variation seen in the real world.

Mannequins pictured

Mannequins were a frequent motif in the works of many early 20th-century artists, notably the metaphysical painters  Giorgio de Chirico, Alberto Savinio and Carlo Carrà.
Shop windows displaying mannequins were a frequent photographic subject for Eugène Atget.

Mannequins are a common theme in horror and science fiction. Mannequins can be disturbing (perhaps due in part to the uncanny valley effect), especially when not fully assembled. The Twilight Zone episode "The After Hours" (1960) involves mannequins taking turns living in the real world as people. In the Doctor Who serial Spearhead from Space (1970), an alien intelligence attempts to take over Earth with killer plastic mannequins called Autons.

The romantic comedy film Mannequin (1987) is a story of a window dresser who falls in love with a mannequin that comes to life.

Military use
Military use of mannequins is recorded amongst the ancient Chinese, such as at the siege of Yongqiu. The besieged Tang army lowered scarecrows down the walls of their castles to lure the fire of the enemy arrows. In this way, they renewed their supplies of arrows. Dummies were also used in the trenches in World War I to lure enemy snipers away from the soldiers.

A Central Intelligence Agency (CIA) report describes the use of a mannequin ("Jack-in-the-Box") as a countersurveillance measure, intended to make it more difficult for the host country's counterintelligence to track the movement of CIA agents posing as diplomats. A "Jack-in-the-Box" – a mannequin representing the upper half of a human – would quickly replace a CIA agent after he left the car driven by another agent and walked away, so that any counterintelligence officers monitoring the agent's car would believe that he was still in the car.

See also
 Agalmatophilia, sexual attraction to mannequins
 Cardiopulmonary resuscitation
 Crash test dummy
 Fusion Specialties, a large mannequin manufacturer
 Ivan Ivanovich - dummy used in Vostok spacecraft test flights
 Mannequin Challenge - a viral Internet video trend
 Model
 Resusci Anne
 Sex doll
Mary Brosnan (mannequin designer)

References

Further reading

 The Recycling and Reuse of Mannequins - See 'Mannakin'
Gross, Kenneth - The Dream of the Moving Statue (Penn State Press 1992)
 Verstappen, Stefan. The Thirty-six Strategies of Ancient China. 1999.

Visual arts materials